Lachnaia paradoxa is a species of leaf beetles in the subfamily Cryptocephalinae. It can be found in Algeria, Morocco, and south Spain.

Variety
Lachnaia paradoxa var. vicina (Lacordaire, 1848)

References

Clytrini
Beetles described in 1808
Taxa named by Guillaume-Antoine Olivier